The Andean crested duck (Lophonetta specularioides alticola) is one of two subspecies of the crested duck. It is much rarer than its sibling subspecies, the Patagonian crested duck.

Description
The Andean crested duck is a medium-sized duck with a length of about 600 mm, a dark nuchal crest and a long, pointed black tail. Its colouring is predominantly grey and brown. The forecrown, sides of the head and neck are pale, while the centre of the crown, the crest and the area behind the eyes are dark brown to black. Much of the body plumage is light brown mottled with darker markings. The wings are dark brown to black. The irides are yellow and the bill and feet dark grey. It is very similar to the nominate subspecies, differing in being slightly larger, browner and less mottled, with a darker purple speculum.

Distribution and habitat
The subspecies is found on lakes in the Andes of South America, ranging at altitudes of 2,000-4,300 m above sea level from the Huánuco Region of central Peru southwards through the mountains of Bolivia to Talca Province in central Chile and Mendoza Province in northern Argentina. It generally breeds above 3,500 m asl.

References

 

Andean crested duck
Andean crested duck
Birds of the Andes
Birds of the Altiplano
Birds of the Southern Andes
Andean crested duck